Sooty's Amazing Adventures is a short-lived animated spin off series of the popular puppet show Sooty.  In this incarnation of the famous bear, he is a full bodied bear free from the puppeteer's hand.

Setting and location 

The gang live in the Fanshawe Theatre in an unknown English coastal town. The four embark on their adventures through a trapdoor located on the theatre's main stage which would take them to various places and times.  However more often than not the trapdoor fails to send them to their desired location.

Main Characters 
Sooty - A quiet and smart bear who is the undisputed leader of the gang. Sooty is the only character in the show that does not talk (yet sometimes makes a rattling noise when he either nods or shakes his head). And being a mute bear finds communication difficult but often gets what he is trying to say across to the rest of the cast. He wears a pair of bright red dungarees with two white buttons. And usually saves his friends with his trusty magic wand which he is only permitted to use once per adventure.

Sweep (voiced by Rob Rackstraw) - Now being able to speak with a rather groany sort of voice rather than the 'squeak' he is so well known for.  Sweep is not the brainiest of the bunch and often thinks of nothing else than food which often involves 'sausages'.  A rather cowardly canine, he never usually hangs around when danger is near. He wears green and blue dungarees and a red collar.

Soo (voiced by Susie Blake) - A young girl panda with an attitude who does not stand for any of the mischief the other two usually get themselves into. Soo could be seen as the sensible one who whips the others into some kind of organisation. She wears a blue dress and a light blue sash with a yellow flower on it and a white underpants.

Little Cousin Scampi  (voiced by Jimmy Hibbert) - The smallest and youngest of the gang, and Sooty's little cousin too. If mischief has been aroused, it is most probably this little bear who has orchestrated it. Little Cousin Scampi appears in a schoolboy outfit.

Other Characters 
Katarina (voiced by Jimmy Hibbert) - A well spoken Persian cat who does not believe any of the gang's adventures down the trapdoor. She wears a pink velvet coat and a pink fedora with a feather on the top.

Captain Fogbound (voiced by Rob Rackstraw) - A ginger cat who pilots a hot air balloon and is courting Katarina. He wears an aviator hat, a dark green leather coat and a pair of brown gloves.

Cousin McScampi (voiced by Jimmy Hibbert) - Scampi's Scottish cousin, who is even worse at bagpipe playing than Scampi is, and wants to find the Loch Ness Monster.

The Aliens (voiced by Rob Rackstraw and Jimmy Hibbert) - Two aliens from the planet Alpha Romeo who become friends with the gang after Sooty saves their spaceship from crashing into the theatre.

Morris the Mouse (voiced by Rob Rackstraw) - A male mouse who lives in the skirting boards of the attic that Sooty and the gang live in. He formerly lived behind the skirting boards of the stage, where he had hibernated since the Victorian era, and woke up because he was hungry for some cheese. He is normally very shy, but he sometimes comes along on the gang's adventures. Morris is not to be confused with the field mouse character with the same name from Muffin The Mule.

Sir Ray Fanshawe (voiced by Rob Rackstraw) - The former owner of the Fanshawe Theatre, who was buried alive underneath a mountain of sausages. He wears a purple fedora with a feather on the top, a Shakespearean ruff, and a purple Elizabethan shirt.

Captain Neecap (voiced by Jimmy Hibbert) - A villainous Frenchman who owns both a submarine and a drilling machine. He is often hatching schemes to kidnap Sooty and the gang.

Rumoured destruction of master recordings and Archival status 
In 2014, Richard Cadell claimed in an interview that when he acquired the rights to Sooty from HIT Entertainment in 2008, he received much archived Sooty material in the process. Said materials included the master tapes to the Sooty's Amazing Adventures series, which he destroyed out of personal distaste for the series. Cadell has since been approached by many other outside sources with the idea, and also attempt, of producing an animated CGI version of Sooty, but he does not want such a series to be made.

However, it is just a myth, and the entire series still exists in the ITV Archive, even though ITV themselves do not currently own the rights to the series. The BFI National Archive also hold four episodes of the series recorded from their original broadcasts on VHS, and there were two commercial VHS releases of the series in 1997 and 1999.

Episodes of the series

Series 1

Series 2

References

1997 British television series debuts
1998 British television series endings
1990s British children's television series
1990s British animated television series
British children's animated fantasy television series
ITV children's television shows
Television series by ITV Studios
Television shows produced by Meridian Broadcasting
English-language television shows
Television series by Cosgrove Hall Films
Sooty
British television spin-offs
Animated television series about bears